The Pafos Aphrodite Festival Cyprus is a company established to promote Paphos in Cyprus as an international centre of high-profile cultural events. Its aim is to organise and manage a yearly international artistic event that takes place at the square in front of the medieval castle at the harbour in Kato Paphos.  It organises and hosts an opera performance at the end of August or early September and has over the years invited a variety of companies and performances to the festival:

Productions

References

Associated Press, Aida by Bolshoi Opera launches Paphos Aphrodite Festival, September 11, 1999.

Opera festivals
Theatre festivals in Cyprus
Festivals in Cyprus